The Sundi (also Sundis, Nsundi, Basundi, Kongo-Sundi, Suundi and Manyanga) are a Central African people established in three countries, in the Republic of Congo – particularly in the Niari department (Kimongo and Londes-Lakayes) and in the Bouenza department (Boko-Songho) –, in Angola (Cabinda) and in the Democratic Republic of Congo. They are considered to be the largest subgroup of the Kongo people. Early in the nineteenth century there were wars between Sundi and Teke when Teke moved southwest into the Niari valley.

References 

This article is based on a translation of the equivalent article of the French Wikipedia

Ethnic groups in the Republic of the Congo
Ethnic groups in the Democratic Republic of the Congo
Ethnic groups in Angola